Rick Monroe is an American country music artist based in Nashville. He has released four albums, three EPs, and several charted singles.

Life and career

Monroe was born in Clearwater, Florida. He grew up in California, Connecticut, Kansas, North Carolina, and England. He started off playing the drums at age nine but then switched over to singing.

His music career started with hard rock, and he was the lead singer for a hard rock bar band before learning guitar and songwriting, which sent him off in a solo direction. Monroe started working the coffeehouse circuits, but then he formed his own band and developed a touring schedule of over 100 dates a year. He established his own record label, Divorce Records, in 1996. He would later release all his four albums on the imprint. In 1999, when he was based in Los Angeles, Monroe recorded his album Shame at CAM studios in Bulverde, Texas.

He covered the song "Midnight Rider" in 2005 as the lead single from his album Against the Grain. Calling him a "musician's musician", Billboard commented that his "warm, supple" voice brought "an edgy energy" to the song. In 2007, Monroe moved to Nashville. His "Crazy Not To" single, released in the summer of 2012, reached top-40 radio and chart status.

It’s A Love Thing, his EP from 2014, included the song "Fires Out", which debuted at #52 of Billboard's Country Indicator, and was a Top 40 Music Row hit, and "Great Minds Drink Alike," which debuted at #58 and has remained his most popular song on YouTube with a video featuring fan footage.

In 2017, Monroe toured the country promoting his new work. He released his six-track EP Gypsy Soul on May 12, 2017. The first single was "This Side of You", which made the Music Row Country Breakout Chart. The song went to the charts during the second week of its release. Monroe was one of the few independent artists given a spot on a sanctioned CMA stage during the 2017 CMA Music Festival.

Monroe has performed in 17 countries, and every U.S. state except for Oregon. He played with artists such as Lee Brice, Aaron Lewis, Eric Church, Charlie Daniels, Dwight Yoakam, Montgomery Gentry, Patty Loveless, Trick Pony, Emerson Drive, Pat Green, Randy Houser, and Josh Thompson. In 2016 alone, he traveled over 100,000 miles and played over 120 shows. He was the Brand Ambassador at seven consecutive Jägermeister Country Tours.

Monroe writes most of his own songs. He has been described as playing "fast and loose country music about cars and beers, tinged with a big rock 'n' roll sound" and singing with a "memorable blues-infused vocal."

Private life

Monroe lives in Nashville with his wife Darci Monroe and dog Gator. He is active in humanitarian causes such as Safe Haven Family Shelter, the Frank Foundation, St. Jude, and the Children's Miracle Network.

Discography

Rick Monroe released five studio albums, one live album, two EPs, and several singles. He has also composed for other singers.

Albums

Singles

Extended plays

Composer

Music videos

References

External links

Living people
American country singer-songwriters
American male singer-songwriters
Country musicians from Florida
20th-century American singers
21st-century American singers
20th-century American male singers
21st-century American male singers
Year of birth missing (living people)
Singer-songwriters from Florida